Sterlibashevsky District (Bashkir and , Stärlebaş rayonı) is an administrative and municipal district (raion), one of the fifty-four in the Republic of Bashkortostan, Russia. It is located in the west of the republic and borders with Miyakinsky District in the north, Sterlitamaksky District in the northeast and east, Meleuzovsky District in the southeast, Fyodorovsky District in the south, and with Orenburg Oblast in the west. Its administrative center is the rural locality (a selo) of Sterlibashevo. As of the 2010 Census, the total population of the district was 20,217, with the population of Sterlibashevo accounting for 29.3% of that number.

History
The district was established on August 20, 1930 as Karagushevsky District with the administrative center in the selo of Karagushevo. On February 20, 1932, the administrative center was moved to Sterlibashevo, and the district was consequently renamed Sterlibashevsky. On February 1, 1963, the district was split between Sterlitamaksky and Meleuzovsky Rural Districts, but was restored on March 3, 1964.

Population 
According to the forecast of the Ministry of Economic Development of Russia, the population will be:

 2024 - 17.48 thousand people
 2035 - 15.72 thousand people

According to the Russian Census 2010: Tatars - 54.3%, Bashkirs - 36.2%, Russians - 5.9%, Chuvash people - 2.3%, others - 1.3%.

Administrative and municipal status
Within the framework of administrative divisions, Sterlibashevsky District is one of the fifty-four in the Republic of Bashkortostan. The district is divided into fifteen selsoviets, comprising sixty-nine rural localities. As a municipal division, the district is incorporated as Sterlibashevsky Municipal District. Its fifteen selsoviets are incorporated as fifteen rural settlements within the municipal district. The selo of Sterlibashevo serves as the administrative center of both the administrative and municipal district.

References

Notes

Sources

Districts of Bashkortostan
States and territories established in 1930
States and territories disestablished in 1963
States and territories established in 1964